The Women's Community Cancer Project Mural is an outdoor mural located in Harvard Square in Cambridge, Massachusetts, USA. It was created by Somerville, Massachusetts artist and activist Beatrice "Be" Sargent in 1998 and dedicated in 1999. The mural is a memorial to twelve women activists who died of cancer. It pays tribute to their contributions and those of people currently fighting the environmental causes of cancer.

History
The Women's Community Cancer Project Mural was co-created by the Women's Community Cancer Project (WCCP) and Be Sargent. The WCCP was a grassroots volunteer organization that came together after Susan Shapiro of Lexington, Massachusetts published the article "Cancer as a Feminist Issue" in the newspaper Sojourner: The Women's Forum. WCCP's members included women with cancer or histories of cancer as well as friends, family, and care-givers of those with cancer. It advocated for new medical, social, and political approaches to cancer—particularly cancers that affect women. WCCP was a founding organization of the National Breast Cancer Coalition. In 2003, it announced that it would continue its work in coalition with other activist organizations.

Description
The Women's Community Cancer Project Mural is displayed at 20 Church Street in Cambridge, Massachusetts. These activists are pictured in the mural:
 Cindy Chin, a domestic violence activist
 Rachel Carson, a biologist and environmentalist
 Audre Lorde, a poet and cancer activist
 Esther Rome, a women's health activist
 Valerie Hinderlie, an anti-racist activist and day care advocate
 Myra Sadker, an activist for gender equality in education
 Jeanmarie (Jeannie) Marshall, a cancer activist and writer
 Agnes Barboza, an immigration services activist to the Cape Verdean community
 Susan Shapiro, founder of the Women's Community Cancer Project, cancer activist, and writer
 Thelma Vanderhoop Weissberg, a Native American rights activist and member of the Wampanoag tribe
 Maria Luisa Alvarez, a day care advocate and teacher trainer
 Jaqueline (Jackie) Shearer, an independent filmmaker and media activist 
Alongside the activists' portraits, the mural depicts examples of environmental carcinogens. Referring to those images in her mural, Be Sargent said, "The powers that be are not going to quake in fear at seeing the carcinogens represented. But passersby may start to avoid and protest these carcinogens—and that might make the powers that be quake in fear."

References 

Murals in Massachusetts
Public art in Massachusetts